This is the discography for American hip hop musician Crooked I aka KXNG Crooked.

Studio albums

Compilation albums

Collaboration albums

Extended plays

Mixtapes

Guest appearances

References 

Discographies of American artists
Hip hop discographies